Shenzhong railway station is a railway station on the Qinghai–Tibet Railway. It serves Shenzhong and is located 67 km from Xining railway station.

See also
List of stations on Qinghai–Tibet railway

Railway stations in Qinghai
Stations on the Qinghai–Tibet Railway